Sar Bisheh (also Romanized as Sar Bīsheh; also known as Tall-e Bīsheh) is a village in Fahlian Rural District, in the Central District of Mamasani County, Fars Province, Iran. At the 2006 census, its population was 78, in 18 families.

References 

Populated places in Mamasani County